Cephaloziella elachista is a species of liverwort belonging to the family Cephaloziellaceae.

Synonyms:
 Cephalozia elachista (J.B.Jack) Lindb.
 Jungermannia elachista J.B.Jack

References

Jungermanniales